Charaxes bernardus, the tawny rajah, is a butterfly that belongs to the rajahs and nawabs group, that is, the Charaxinae group of the brush-footed butterflies family. This species can be found in India, China, Indomalaya, and onwards to Indonesia.

Description
The upperside of wings is reddish brown or pale brown-orange, with dark brown/black speckles at the wings tips and small black marks at the margin of the hindwings. On the underside of the wings there are irregular wavy or tawny brown speckles and whitish zigzag bands. Males and females are very similar in appearance.

Habits
It has been recorded as a migrant in South India and is known to mud-puddle.

Food plants
Known food plants of this species include:
Aglaia lawii, Aglaia roxburghiana (Meliaceae), Cinnamomum camphora, Litsea glutinosa, Litsea populifolia (Lauraceae), Sapium sebiferum (Euphorbiaceae), Adenanthera pavonina, Paraserianthes falcataria (= Falcataria moluccana), Tamarindus indica (Leguminosae), and Acronychia penduculata (Rutaceae).

Subspecies
Charaxes bernardus bernardus – present in China and Hong Kong
Charaxes bernardus acolus Fruhstorfer – eastern Sumatra
Charaxes bernardus agna Moore, 1878 – in Thailand and Burma
Charaxes bernardus ajax Fawcett, 1897 – western Sumatra
Charaxes bernardus bajula Staudinger, 1889 – Palawan
Charaxes bernardus baliensis Joicey & Talbot, 1922 – Bali
Charaxes bernardus basilisae Schröder & Treadaway, 1982 – Philippines
Charaxes bernardus baya (Moore, 1857) – Java and Bali
Charaxes bernardus crepax Fruhstorfer, 1914 – Malaysia and Singapore
Charaxes bernardus cybistia Fruhstorfer
Charaxes bernardus enganicus Fruhstorfer, 1904
Charaxes bernardus hainanus Gu, 1994 – Hainan
Charaxes bernardus hemana Butler, 1870 – Nepal
Charaxes bernardus hierax C. & R. Felder, [1867] – Assam, Cambodia and southern Yunnan.
Charaxes bernardus hindia Butler, 1872
Charaxes bernardus kangeanensis Hanafusa, 1990
Charaxes bernardus mahawedi Fruhstorfer – northern Indochina
Charaxes bernardus mirabilis Hanafusa, 1989
Charaxes bernardus mitschkei Lathy, 1913 – Nias
Charaxes bernardus phlegontis Fruhstorfer
Charaxes bernardus repetitus Butler, 1896 – Borneo
Charaxes bernardus siporanus Hanafusa, 1992
Charaxes bernardus siporaensis (Hanafusa, 1992)
Charaxes bernardus varenius Fruhstorfer

See also

Charaxinae
Nymphalidae
List of butterflies of India
List of butterflies of India (Nymphalidae)

Notes

References

External links
Charaxes bernardus images at Consortium for the Barcode of Life
Charaxes bernardus crepax images at BOLD

Butterflies of Asia
Butterflies of Indochina
Bernardus
Endemic fauna of India
Butterflies described in 1793